Hilda Martindale (12 March 1875 – 18 April 1952) was a British civil servant and author, and the daughter of Louisa Martindale.  She was a prominent campaigner for the improvement of working conditions, particularly those of women. Her will established the Hilda Martindale Trust in 1952 to fund British women attempting to establish themselves in professions dominated by men.

Early life and education 
Hilda Martindale was born on 12 March 1875 in Leytonstone. Her mother was Louisa Martindale, née Spicer, a British activist for women's rights and suffragist.  Her father was William Martindale, a City merchant who died before she was born. Her elder sister Dr. Louisa Martindale (named after their mother) was a leading surgeon.

She was taught initially by governesses in Switzerland and Germany before attending Brighton High School for Girls (now Brighton Girls). She would go on to study at Royal Holloway College and later at Bedford College. During 1900-1901 she traveled around the world studying how children were treated.

Career and activism 
In 1901 she became a factory inspector with the Home Office. She was one of Britain's first female factory inspectors. In 1903 she wrote an important report about lead poisoning in brickworks. In 1904 she and her mother attended the International Congress of Women in Berlin. By 1914 she had become a Senior Lady Inspector. In 1918 she was a recipient of one of the 1918 Birthday Honours; specifically, she was made an Officer of the Order of the British Empire (OBE).

In 1925 she became Deputy Chief Inspector of Factories. In 1933 she joined the Treasury, and she retired at age 65 in 1937. She had been one of the first women to reach the higher levels of the Civil Service. She was a member of the Whitley Council Committee on the Women's Question, and as such she argued in favour of women's right to choose whether or not to leave their jobs if they got married, as well as in favour of equal pay.

After retiring, she wrote books including A History of Women in the Civil Service,  One Generation to Another (about her family), Some Victorian Portraits,  and Women Servants of the State: 1870-1938.

Death and legacy 
Martindale died on 18 April 1952 at 44 Coleherne Court, South Kensington, London.

In her will she appointed Bedford College as trustees of the Hilda Martindale Trust, which "makes a very limited number of awards to British women towards training or studying for a career in a profession where women are underrepresented. The maximum award is £3,000."

References

1875 births
1952 deaths
British civil servants
British feminists
British writers
Factory inspectors
Officers of the Order of the British Empire
Women civil servants
People from Leytonstone
International Congress of Women people
British women writers